Olena Olehivna Fedorova (born 14 November 1986) is a Ukrainian diver from Mykolaiv.

Career
She has competed at the 2004, 2008 and 2012 Summer Olympics. She competed in the individual 3 m springboard at the 2004 and 2008 Games, and in the individual and synchronised 3 m springboard events at the 2012 Summer Olympics. In the synchronised event, she competed with Hanna Pysmenska.

References

External links
 

1986 births
Living people
Sportspeople from Mykolaiv
Ukrainian female divers
Divers at the 2004 Summer Olympics
Divers at the 2008 Summer Olympics
Divers at the 2012 Summer Olympics
Divers at the 2016 Summer Olympics
Olympic divers of Ukraine
Universiade medalists in diving
Universiade silver medalists for Ukraine
Medalists at the 2005 Summer Universiade
Medalists at the 2011 Summer Universiade
21st-century Ukrainian women